Pharmaceutical codes are used in medical classification to uniquely identify medication. They may uniquely identify an active ingredient, drug system (including inactive ingredients and time-release agents) in general, or a specific pharmaceutical product from a specific manufacturer.

Examples

Drug system identifiers (manufacturer-specific including inactive ingredients):
 National Drug Code (NDC) — administered by Food and Drug Administration.
 Drug Identification Number (DIN) — administered by Health Canada under the Food and Drugs Act
 Hong Kong Drug Registration — administered by the Pharmaceutical Service of the Department of Health (Hong Kong)
 National Pharmaceutical Product Index - South Africa

Hierarchical systems:
 Anatomical Therapeutic Chemical Classification System (AT, or ATC/DDD) — administered by World Health Organization
 Generic Product Identifier (GPI) — hierarchical classification number published by MediSpan
 SNOMED — C axis

Ingredients:
 Unique Ingredient Identifier

Proprietary database identifiers include those assigned by First Databank, Micromedex, MediSpan, Gold Standard Drug Database (published by Elsevier), and Cerner Multum MediSource Lexicon; these are cross-indexed by RxNorm, which also assigns a unique identifier (RxCUI) to every combination of active ingredient and dose level.

See also
 Drug nomenclature
 Drug class

References 

Pharmacological classification systems